The Viper telescope was mainly used to view cosmic background radiation. First operational in 1998, the telescope was used to help scientists prove or disprove the Big Crunch theory. The telescope was at the time also one of the most powerful of its kind. Previous cosmic background telescopes were smaller and less sensitive. It was decommissioned in 2005.

Location 
The Viper telescope was located at the Center for Astrophysical Research, also known as (CARA) in the Amundsen-Scott station in Antarctica. The Viper project was run by many scientists; team leader Dr. Jeffrey Peterson is a Carnegie Mellon astrophysicist.

References

External links 
National Science Foundation
Antarctic Treaty
Harvard

Cosmic microwave background experiments
Interferometric telescopes